This list identifies the fixed line operators and the mobile operators for the top 200 most populous countries in the world.

The list of countries and their populations is from List of countries by population. The CIA World Factbook is cited as the standard reference for the number of main lines for each of the listed countries.

List of countries by number of broadband Internet subscriptions is cited as the standard reference for the number of fixed broadband subscribers for each of the listed countries. The country naming convention follows the ISO 3166-1 standard as published by the International Organization for Standardization (ISO).

World's largest telecom companies by total revenue

The world's largest telecommunications companies measured by total revenues.

Note: When $USD revenues unavailable from reliable sites, currency conversions for 2018-2020 revenues are based on the closing currency exchange rate on the last day of 2018-2020 (December 31).

Afghanistan

Fixed line operators
 Afghan Telecom

Mobile operators
 Salaam Network
 Afghan Wireless (Telephone Systems International)
 MTN Afghanistan (MTN Group)
 Etisalat Afghanistan (Etisalat)
 Roshan (AKFED, Cable & Wireless and Telia Company)

Albania

Fixed line operators
 Abissnet
 ABCom Shpk
 Albania Satellite Communications Shpk
 ALBtelecom (Calik Holding)
 Primo Communications Shpk (Telekom Slovenije)
 Telekom (COSMOTE)

Mobile operators
 ALBtelecom (ALBtelecom Sh.a)
 Telekom (COSMOTE)
 Vodafone (Vodafone Greece)

Algeria

Fixed operators
 Algérie Telecom

Mobile operators
 Djezzy (Orascom Telecom Algerie) (OTA) subsidiary of Orascom Telecom Holding (OTH)
 Mobilis (Algérie Telecom)
 Nedjma (Wataniya Télécom Algérie), a subsidiary of Qatar Telecom (Qtel)

Mobile satellite operators 
 ATS, a subsidiary of Algérie Telecom

Angola

Fixed line operators
 Angola Telecom
 MSTelcom (Sonangol Group)

Mobile operators
 Movicel
 MovelSIM
 Unitel

Argentina

Fixed line operators
 Claro (América Móvil)
 Fibertel (Telecom Argentina)
 Telefónica (Telefónica)
 Telecom (Telecom Argentina)

Mobile operators
 Claro (América Móvil)
 Movistar (Telefónica)
 Personal (Telecom Argentina)

Armenia

Fixed line operators
 Beeline (Vimpelcom)
 Aither (OfficePhone.am)
 Crossnet

Mobile operators
 Beeline
 Ucom
 Viva Cell MTS

Aruba (Netherlands)

Fixed line operators
 SetarNV

Mobile operators
 Digicel (Digicel Group)
 SetarNV

Australia

Fixed line operators
 Telstra
 Optus (SingTel)
 TPG
 Vocus
 Vodafone
 Macquarie Telecom
 NBN

Mobile operators
 Optus Mobile (Singtel)
 Telstra Mobile (Telstra)
 Vodafone Australia (TPG Telecom)

Austria

Fixed line operators
 MegaTel
 Tele2UTA (Tele2)
 Telekom Austria

Mobile operators
 3 (CK Hutchison Holdings)
 A1 (Telekom Austria Group)
 T-Mobile Austria (Deutsche Telekom)
 m:tel Austria (Telekom Srbija)

Azerbaijan

Fixed line operators
 AzEuroTel
 Aztelekom
 Baktelecom
 Katel
 Ultel

Mobile operators
 Azercell
 Azerfon
 Bakcell
 Naxtel

Bahamas

Fixed line operators
 Liberty Latin America as BTC

Mobile operators
 BTC
 aliv

Bahrain

Fixed line operators
 Batelco
 LightSpeed Communications

Mobile operators
 Batelco
 STC Bahrain (Previously VIVA Bahrain)
 Zain Bahrain (Zain Group)

WiMAX operators
 MenaTelecom
 Zain Bahrain (Zain Group)

Bangladesh

Fixed line operators
 Aarontel
 Bangladesh Telecommunications Company Limited 
 BanglaPhone
 Bayphones Limited
 Dhaka Telephone Company Limited
 Jalalabad Telephone
 Jubok Phone
 National Telecom Limited
 OneTel Limited
 Peoples Telecom
 Ranks Telecom Ltd.
 S A Tel
 ShebaTelecom
 TeleBarta Limited
 WorldTel

WiMAX operators
 BanglaLion (BanglaLion Communications Ltd)
 Qubee (Augere)

Mobile phone Operator
 Grameenphone
 Robi Axiata
 Banglalink
 Teletalk

Barbados

Fixed line operators
 Liberty Latin America as LIME (Cable & Wireless Communications)

Mobile operators
 Digicel (Barbados) Limited (Digicel Group)
 Ozone Wireless
 WiNET

Belarus

Fixed line operators
 Beltelecom

Mobile operators
 MTS (Mobile TeleSystems)
 A1 (A1 Telekom Austria Group)
 Life:)

Belgium

Fixed line operators
 Proximus
 Scarlet (Proximus)
 Telenet (Liberty Global)

Cable operators
 Telenet (Liberty Global)
 VOO

Mobile operators
 Telenet/Base (Liberty Global)
 Orange Belgium
 Proximus

Belize

Fixed line operators
 Belize Telemedia
 Speednet Communications Limited

Mobile operators
 Belize Telemedia
 Speednet Communications Limited

Benin

Fixed line operators
 Benin Telecoms

Mobile operators
 BBCOM (Bell Bénin Communication)
 GLOBACOM
 LIBERCOM
 MOOV Bénin
 MTN (MTN Group)

Bhutan

Fixed line operators
 Bhutan Telecom Ltd.

Mobile operators
 Airtel Bhutan
 BMobile (Bhutan Telecom Ltd.)

Bolivia

Fixed line operators

National operators 
Entel (ENTEL S.A.) (private, over 97% shares owned by Ministry of Public Works, Services and Housing)
AXS (AXS Bolivia S.A.) (Santa Cruz de la Sierra, La Paz and Cochabamba only)

Regional cooperatives 
COTEL R.L. (La Paz Department)
COMTECO R.L. (Cochabamba Department)
COTAS R.L. (Santa Cruz Department)
COTES R.L. (Chuquisaca Department)
COTAP R.L. (Potosí Department)
COTEOR R.L. (Oruro Department)
COSETT R.L. (Tarija Department)
COTEAUTRI R.L. (Beni Department)
COTECO R.L. (Pando Department)
COTERI R.L. (Riberalta)
COTEGUA R.L. (Guayaramerín)
COTABE R.L. (Bermejo)
COTEVI R.L. (Villazón)
COTEMO R.L. (Santa Ana de Yacuma)
COSEU R.L. (Uyuni)

Mobile operators
Entel (ENTEL S.A.)
Viva (Empresa de Telecomunicaciones Nuevatel PCS de Bolivia S.A.) (Balesia and COMTECO)
Tigo Bolivia (TELECEL S.A.) (Millicom)

Bosnia and Herzegovina

Fixed line operators
 BH Line (BH Telecom)
 HT Mostar
 m:tel (Telekom Srbija)

Mobile operators
 BH Mobile (BH Telecom)
 Eronet (HT Mostar)
 m:tel (Telekom Srbija)

Botswana

Fixed line operators
 Botswana Telecommunications Corporation

Mobile operators
 Botswana Telecommunications Corporation
 MASCOM
 Orange

Brazil

Fixed line operators

Major operators
 Embratel (América Móvil)
 Oi (Oi S.A.)
 TIM (Telecom Italia)
 Vivo (Telefónica)

Minor operators
 Algar Telecom
 Sercomtel

Mobile operators

Major operators
 Claro (América Móvil)
 Oi (Oi S.A.)
 TIM (Telecom Italia)
 Vivo (Telefónica)

Minor operators
 Algar Telecom
 Sercomtel

Brunei

Fixed line operators
 Unified National Networks UNN
 Telekom Brunei TelBru

Mobile operators
 Unified National Networks UNN
 DST Communications (DST-COM)
 Progresif cellular

Bulgaria

Fixed line operators
 Interoute
 Neterra
 Nexcom Bulgaria
 Orbitel (Spectrum Net, part of Alfa Finance Holding) bought by Mtel (now A1 Bulgaria)
 Vivacom (Bulgarian Telecommunications Company)

Mobile operators
 MAX (before 2014, Max Telecom)
 A1 Bulgaria (former Mtel) (Telekom Austria)
 Telenor Bulgaria (Telenor)
 Vivacom (Bulgarian Telecommunications Company)
 Bulsatcom (Bulsatcom)

Burkina Faso

Fixed line operators
 Onatel (Morocco Telecom)

Mobile operators
 Airtel Burkina Faso (Airtel Group)

Burundi

Fixed line operators
 LEO Burundi
 ONATEL Burundi

Mobile operators
 Econet Wireless
 Hits Telecom
 Onamob
 Safari
 U-Com

Cambodia

Fixed line operators
 Ministry of Posts and Telecommunications

Mobile operators
 Cellcard (The Royal Group)
 Seatel (Chinese company)
 Latelz Company Limited (Axiata Group Berhad)
 Metfone (Viettel)
 Cootel (Shinwei Company)

Cameroon

Fixed line operators
 Cameroon Telecom

Mobile operators
 Cameroon Telecom
 CISNET TELECOM (CISNET Group)
 MTN (MTN Group)
 Orange (Orange S.A.)
 WiMax (WiMax Group)

Canada

Fixed line operators

 Allstream
 Bell Canada
 Bell Aliant 
 Manitoba Telecom Services
 Eastlink
 Northwestel
 Provincial Tel
 Rogers Telecom (Rogers Communications)
 SaskTel
 Telus
 Sogetel

Mobile operators

 Bell Mobility (Bell Canada)
 MTS Mobility (Manitoba Telecom Services)
 DMTS Mobility
 Télébec Mobilité
 Virgin Plus Canada (Formerly Virgin Mobile)
 Lucky Mobile
 Freedom Mobile (Shaw Communications)
 ICE Wireless
 Rogers Wireless (Rogers Communications)
 Fido Solutions (Rogers Communications)
 Mobilicity
 Chatr
 SaskTel Mobility (SaskTel)
 Vidéotron Mobilité (Québecor)
 Fizz Mobile (Québecor)
 Telus Mobility (Telus)
 Koodo Mobile
 Public Mobile

Chad

Fixed line operators
 SotelTchad

Mobile operators
 Airtel Chad (Bharti Airtel)
 Tigo Chad (Millicom)

Chile

Fixed line operators
 Claro HFC (América Móvil)
 CMET
 Entelphone (Entel)
 Gtd Manquehue (GTD)
 Gtd Telesat (GTD)
 Rural Telecommunications Chile S.A. (RTC)
 Telefónica (formerly CTC)
 Telefónica del Sur (GTD)

Cable operators
 VTR (Liberty Global)

Mobile operators
 Claro (América Móvil)
 Entel PCS (Entel)
 Movistar (Telefónica)
 Virgin
 WOM

China

Fixed line operators
 China Telecom
 China Tietong (China Mobile Communications Corp)
 China Unicom

Mobile operators
 China Mobile 
 China Telecom
 China Unicom

Colombia

Fixed line operators
 Azteca
 Emcali
 ETB
 Telefónica Telecom
 UNE EPM (formerly EPM – Empresas Públicas de Medellín)

Mobile operators
 Avantel
 Claro Colombia (América Móvil)
 ETB (via Tigo network)
 Móvil éxito (Grupo Éxito) (via Tigo network)
 Movistar (Telefónica)
 Tigo Colombia (Millicom, ETB, EPM)
 Uff Móvil (Bancolombia, Grupo Ardila Lulle) (via Tigo network)
 UNE (EPM)
 Virgin Mobile (via Movistar network)

Comoros

Fixed line operators
 Comores Telecom

Democratic Republic of the Congo

Fixed line operators
 OCPT

Mobile operators
 Airtel DRC (Airtel Group
 Orange RDC (Orange S.A.)
 Tigo Democratic Republic of Congo (Millicom)
 Vodacom (Vodafone)

Republic of the Congo

Mobile operators
 Congo Telecom

Mobile operators
 Airtel Congo (Airtel Group)
 Warid Congo (Warid Telecom)

Costa Rica

Fixed line operators
 Grupo ICE
 RACSA-ICE (Grupo ICE)
 VoCex (R&H Telecom)
Tigo (Millicom)
Liberty (Liberty Latin America)
Telecable
CoopeGuanacaste

Mobile operators
 Claro (América Móvil)
 kölbi (Grupo ICE)
Liberty (Liberty Latin America)
Tuyo (MVNO ICE Network)
Full Móvil (MVNO Racsa, ICE Network)

Croatia

Fixed line operators
 Amis Telekom (bought & replaced by A1 Hrvatska (A1 Telekom Austria))
A1 Hrvatska (A1 Telekom Austria)
H1 Telekom (bought & replaced by Optima Telekom)
 Iskon Internet
 Optima Telekom
 Hrvatski Telekom (Deutsche Telekom)

Mobile operators

 Hrvatski Telekom (Deutsche Telekom)
 Simpa (owned by T-HT)
Bonbon (owned by T-HT)
Telemach (was Tele2)
A1 Hrvatska (A1 Telekom Austria)

Curaçao (Netherlands)

Fixed line operators
 UTS Curaçao

Mobile operators
 Digicel (Digicel Group)
 UTS Curaçao

Cuba

Fixed line operators
 ETECSA

Mobile operators
 CUBACEL

Cyprus

Fixed line operators

 CYTA
 Epic
 PrimeTel
 Cablenet

Mobile operators

 CYTA
 Epic
 PrimeTel

Czech Republic

Fixed line operators
 GTS Czech, GTS CE
 O2 (Telefónica)
 Telekom Austria Czech Republic (Telekom Austria)

Mobile operators
 T-Mobile (Deutsche Telekom)
 O2 Czech Republic (Telefónica)
 U:fon (MobilKom)
 Vodafone Czech Republic (Vodafone)

Other operators
 Call Systems CZ s.r.o.
 XOTel Czech s.r.o.

Denmark

Fixed line operators
 TDC
 Telia Company

Mobile operators
 3 (CK Hutchison Holdings)
 TDC
 Telenor (previously Sonofon)

Dominican Republic

Fixed operators
 Claro Codetel (América Móvil)
 Altice Dominicana
 Viva

Mobile operators
 Viva
 Claro Codetel (América Móvil)
 Altice Dominicana
 Orange (Orange S.A.)

Ecuador

Fixed line operators
 CNT EP

Mobile operators
 Claro (América Móvil)
 CNT EP
 Movistar (Telefónica)
 Tuenti (Telefónica)

Egypt

Fixed line operators
 Telecom Egypt

Mobile operators
 Etisalat Egypt (Etisalat)
 Orange Egypt (Orange S.A.)
 Vodafone Egypt (Vodafone and Telecom Egypt)
 We (Telecom Egypt)

Data Service Providers
 NOOR Data Network

El Salvador

Fixed line operators
 Telefónica

Mobile operators
 Claro (América Móvil)
 Digicel (Digicel Group)
 Movistar (Telefónica)
 Red Telecom (Infonet)
 Tigo El Salvador (Millicom)

Equatorial Guinea

Fixed line operators
 GETESA (Orange S.A.)

Mobile operators
 GETESA (Orange S.A.)
 Muni (Antes Hits Telecom)
 Gecomsa

Eritrea

Fixed line operators
 Telesonra

Mobile operators
 EriTel

Estonia

Fixed line operators
 Telia Eesti (Telia Company)

Mobile operators
 Elisa Eesti (Elisa)
 Telia Eesti (Telia Company)
 Tele2 Eesti (Tele2)

Ethiopia

Fixed line operators
 Ethio Telecom

Fixed line operators
$ safaricom Ethiopia

Mobile operators
 Ethio Telecom
 Safaricom Ethiopia

Fiji

Fixed line operators
 Telecom Fiji

Mobile operators
 Digicel Fiji (Digicel)
 INKK Mobile (Boost Mobile)
 Vodafone Fiji (Vodafone)

International operator
Fintel

Finland

Mobile operators
 DNA Finland
 Elisa (Elisa and Vodafone)
 Telia Company

France

Fixed line operators
 Bouygues Telecom (Bouygues)
 Free (Iliad SA)
 Orange S.A.
 SFR (Altice)

Mobile operators
 Bouygues Telecom (Bouygues)
 Free Mobile (Iliad S.A.)
 Orange S.A.
 SFR (Altice)

French Guiana

Fixed line operators
 Telesur

Mobile operators
 Digicel (Digicel Group)

French Polynesia

Fixed line operators
 OPT Polynesia
 Tahiti Nui Telecom
 Ora (Viti)

Mobile operators
 Vodafone Polynésie (PMT)
 Ora de Viti

Gabon

Fixed line operators
 Gabon Telecom (Maroc Telecom)

Mobile operators
 Airtel (Bharti Airtel)
 Gabon Telecom (Maroc Telecom)
 Moov (Etisalat)

Gambia

Fixed line operators
 Gamtel

Mobile operators
 Africell (Lintel Holding)
 Gamcel (Gamtel)
 Q-cell (Qcell)

Georgia

Fixed line operators
 MagtiCom
 Silknet
 New Net
 DataComm

Mobile operators
 MagtiCom
 Silknet (Including Geocell branch)
 Mobitel (Beeline Group)

Germany

Fixed line operators

Major operators
 O2 DSL (Telefónica)
 T-Home (Deutsche Telekom)
 Vodafone (Vodafone Plc.)

Mobile operators

Major operators
 O2 (Telefónica)
 T-Mobile (Deutsche Telekom)
 Vodafone (Vodafone Plc.)

Ghana

Fixed line operators
 Vodafone Ghana

Mobile operators
 Airtel Ghana (Airtel Group)
 Cliq (Expresso Telecom)
 Globacom 
 MTN Ghana (MTN Group)
 Tigo
 Vodafone Ghana

Greece

Fixed line operators
 COSMOTE (Deutsche Telekom)
 Vodafone Greece (Vodafone)
 WIND Hellas (United Group)
Nova (United Group)

Mobile operators
 COSMOTE (OTE)
 Vodafone Greece (Vodafone)
 WIND Hellas (United Group)

WiMAX operators
 COSMOTE (Deutsche Telekom)

Grenada

Fixed line operators
 Liberty Latin America as LIME

Mobile operators
 Digicel (Digicel Group)
 LIME

Guadeloupe
This country had 0.159 million main lines in use in 1995.

Fixed line operators
 Outremer Telecom

Mobile operators
 Digicel (Digicel Group)

Guam (United States)

Fixed line operators
 GTA Teleguam

Mobile operators
 GTA Teleguam

Guatemala

Fixed line operators
 A-Tel (America Telephone)
 Americatel Guatemala (Entel (Chile))
 AT&T Guatemala (AT&T Inc.)
 Cablenet SA
 Empresa Guatemalteca de Telecomunicaciones (GUATEL) (state-owned)
 Telecomunicaciones de Guatemala (América Móvil)
 Telecomunique Guatemala (Telecomunique)
 Claro (América Móvil)

Mobile operators
 Claro (América Móvil)
 Digicel (Digicel Group)
 Tigo Guatemala (Millicom)

Guinea

Fixed line operators
 Sotelgui

Mobile operators
 Areeba
 Cellcom
 Intercel
 Lagui
 Orange Guinea

Guyana

Fixed line operators
 Guyana Telephone and Telegraph Company

Mobile operators
 Digicel (Digicel Group)
 Guyana Telephone and Telegraph Company

Haiti

Fixed line operators
 Natcom S.A (formerly Teleco S.A)

Mobile operators
 Comcel Haiti (acquired by Digicel Group in April 2012)
 Digicel (Digicel Group)
 My Haiti Mobile (My Haiti Mobile)

Honduras

Fixed line operators
 Hondutel

Mobile operators
 Claro (América Móvil)
 Digicel (Digicel Group)
 Honducel (Hondutel)
 Tigo Honduras (Millicom)

Hong Kong

Fixed line operators
 Hutchison Global Communications
 PCCW
 Hong Kong Broadband
 Wharf T&T

Mobile operators
 3 HK (CK Hutchison Holdings)
 China Mobile Hong Kong
 CSL1010
 SmarTone

Hungary

Fixed line operators
 BudgeTalk (CG-Systems)
 DIGI  (RCS&RDS)
 GTS Hungary (GTS CE)
 Media Exchange
 Rebell Telecommunication
Invitel
 Magyar Telekom (Deutsche Telekom)
 Vodafone (formerly: UPC Magyarország)

Mobile operators
 Magyar Telekom, formerly known as T-Mobile (Deutsche Telekom)
 DIGI Mobile
 Telenor, formerly known as Pannon and Pannon GSM
 Vodafone

Discontinued operators 
Westel 0660 (on NMT 450 MHz) - Predecessor of Westel 900, later T-mobile and later Magyar Telekom
Matáv (fixed line) - Predecessor of T-com and later Magyar Telekom

Iceland

Fixed line operators
 Síminn

Mobile operators
 Síminn
 Vodafone Iceland
 Nova

India

Fixed line operators
According to the Telecom Regulatory Authority of India, as on October 2022, the top 5 operators accounted for 98.4% of market share.

These operators are as follows:
 Bharti Airtel Limited (Branded as Airtel)
 Bharat Sanchar Nigam Limited (Branded as BSNL)
 Atria Convergence Technologies Limited (Branded as ACT)
 Reliance Jio Infocomm Limited (Branded as Jio)
 Hathway Cable and Datacom Limited
Other notable operators include:

Tata Play Broadband Private Limited
 Mahanagar Telephone Nigam Limited (Branded as MTNL)
 RailTel Corporation of India Limited
 DEN Networks Limited
 Vodafone Idea Limited (Branded as You Broadband)

Mobile operators
The following operators have been classified as Wireless Service Providers by the Telecom Regulatory Authority of India:
 Bharti Airtel Limited (Branded as Airtel)
 Bharat Sanchar Nigam Limited (Branded as BSNL Mobile, CellOne)
 Reliance Jio Infocomm Limited (Branded as Jio)
 Vodafone Idea Limited (Branded as Vi)
 Mahanagar Telephone Nigam Limited (Branded as MTNL, Dolphin)
 Reliance Communications Limited (Continues to remain licensed, but has ceased mobile telephony operations; Was branded as Reliance)

Indonesia

Fixed line operators
 Telkom Indonesia
 Indosat Ooredoo Hutchison
 OFON

Mobile operators
 Indosat Ooredoo Hutchison – has run mobile payment/wallet
 Smartfren – has run mobile payment/wallet
 Telkomsel – has run mobile payment/wallet
 XL Axiata
 Hinet

Iran

Fixed line operators
 TCI
 Zoha Kish Telecom Iran
 HiWEB

Mobile operators
 Airtel Pras
 Hamrah Aval
 Kish Free Zone
 MTCE
 MTN Irancell (MTN Group)
 Rightel
 Taliya

TD-LTE operators
 Mobinnet
 MTN Irancell

Iraq

Fixed line operators
 ITPC

Mobile operators
 AsiaCell (Qtel)
 Korek Telecom
 Moutiny
 SanaTel
 Zain Iraq (Zain Group)

Ireland

Fixed line operators
 ASI Contracting
 BT Ireland (BT Group)
 Eir
 Smart Telecom
 Virgin Media Ireland (Liberty Global)
 Vodafone Ireland (Vodafone)

Mobile operators
 Eir Mobile (Eir)
 Meteor (Eir)
 Tesco Mobile (Tesco)
 Three Ireland (CK Hutchison Holdings)
 Vodafone Ireland (Vodafone)
 Virgin Mobile Ireland (Liberty Global)

Israel

Fixed line operators
 012 Smile
 013 Netvision
 018 X-Fone
 Bezeq
 Cellcom
 Hot
 Partner Communications Company
 Voicenter

Mobile operators
 Cellcom
 Golan Telecom
 Home Cellular (MVNO using Cellcom)
 Hot Mobile former Mirs Communications Ltd.
 Partner Communications Company (Partner)
 Pelephone (Bezeq)
 Rami Levi (MVNO) using Pelephone)
 YouPhone (MVNO) using Orange)

see also the Palestinian Territories

Italy

Fixed telephony 
 Fastweb (Swisscom)
 Iliad (Iliad)
 TIM (Gruppo TIM), formerly SIP and Telecom Italia
 Vodafone (Vodafone)
 Wind Tre (CK Hutchison Holdings), formerly Infostrada

Mobile telephony 
 Fastweb (Swisscom)
 Iliad (Iliad)
 TIM (Gruppo TIM), formerly Telecom Italia Mobile
 Vodafone (Vodafone), formerly Omnitel
 Wind Tre (CK Hutchison Holdings), formerly Wind and 3

Ivory Coast

Fixed line operators
 Orange (Orange S.A.)

Mobile operators
 Green
 Koz
 Moov
 MTN Côte d'Ivoire (MTN Group)
 Orange (Orange S.A.)
 Warid

Jamaica

Fixed line operators
 FLOW, newly merged entity combining the old Flow and LIME; owned by Cable & Wireless Communications, a Liberty Global company
 Digicel Play, a new fibre to the home network owned by Digicel Group

Wireless broadband operators
 DEKAL Wireless, a municipal Wi-Fi network owned by Cable & Wireless Communications and operated by FLOW Jamaica
 Caricel, a new Jamaican owned startup, soon to offer fixed and mobile broadband via an LTE-A network
 Digicel, through their WiMAX network (which is currently being upgraded to TDD-LTE)

Mobile operators
 Digicel (Digicel Group)
 FLOW (owned by Cable & Wireless Communications, a Liberty Global company)

Japan

Fixed line operators

 KDDI
 NTT
 SoftBank Telecom

Mobile operators

 au by KDDI
 NTT DoCoMo (NTT)
 SoftBank Mobile
 Ymobile

Jersey (UK)

Fixed line operators
 Jersey Telecom

Mobile operators
 Airtel

Jordan

Fixed line operators
 Jordan Telecom (Jordan Telecom Group)
 Kulacom

Mobile operators
 Orange Jordan (Jordan Telecom Group & Orange S.A.)
 Umniah (Batelco)
 XPress Telecom (NASCO & Qtel)
 Zain Jordan (Zain)

Kazakhstan

Fixed line operators
 KazakhTelecom

Mobile operators
 Altel/Tele2 (Kazakhtelecom)
 Kcell/Activ (Kazakhtelecom)
 Beeline (VimpelCom)

Kenya

Fixed line operators
 Telkom Kenya
 Wananchi

Mobile operators
 Airtel Kenya (Airtel Group)
 Telkom Kenya
 Safaricom (Telkom Kenya and Vodafone)
 Orange (Orange S.A.)

North Korea

Fixed line operators
Korea Posts and Telecommunications Corporation

Mobile operators
Koryolink (VEON / Korea Posts and Telecommunications Corporation)

South Korea

Fixed line operators
 KT (Korea Telecom)
 LG U+ (LG Group)
 SK Broadband (SK Group)

Mobile operators
 KT (Korea Telecom)
 LG U+ (LG Group)
 SK Telecom (SK Group)

WiMAX operators
 KT (Korea Telecom)
 SK Telecom (SK Group)

Kuwait

Fixed line operators
 Ministry of Communications – Kuwait (MOCK)

Mobile operators
 VIVA - Kuwait Telecom Company (STC)
 Ooreedoo Kuwait (Ooreedoo Group)
 Zain Kuwait (Zain Group)

Kyrgyzstan

Fixed line operators

 Kyrgyztelecom

Mobile operators

 MegaCom
 Beeline
 O!

Laos

Fixed line operators
 Lao Telecom

Latvia

Fixed line operators
 Kurzemes Datorcentrs
 Lattelecom
 OPTRON

Mobile operators
 Bite (TDC)
 LMT
 Tele2
 Triatel (Telekom Baltija)

Lebanon

Fixed line operators
 OGERO (MPT)

Mobile operators
 Alfa (management contract to Orascom Telecom)
 Mtc touch (management contract to Zain)

Lesotho

Fixed line operators
 Telecom Lesotho

Mobile operators
 Econet Wireless
 Vodacom (Telkom and Vodafone)

Libya

Fixed line operators
 General Posts and Telecommunications Company
 Libya Telecom & Technology

Mobile operators
 Almadar
 Libyana

Lithuania

Fixed line operators
 Telia Lietuva

Mobile operators
 Bitė Lietuva
 Telia Lietuva
 Tele2

Luxembourg

Fixed line operators
 Cegecom S.A.
 Luxembourg Online
 Onyx GSM
 VOX
 P&TLuxembourg
 Tele2 Luxembourg (Belgacom)

Mobile operators
 LuxGSM (P&TLuxembourg)
 Tango (Belgacom)
 VOXMobile (Orange S.A.)

Macau (China)

Fixed line operators
 Companhia de Telecomunicações de Macau S.A.R.L. (CTM)

Mobile operators
 3 (CK Hutchison Holdings)

Madagascar

Fixed line operators
 Telma

Mobile operators
 Airtel
 orange
 Telma

Malawi

Mobile operators
 Airtel Malawi (Airtel Group)

Malaysia

Fixed line operators
 Maxis (Maxis Mobile Sdn Bhd; formerly Binariang)
 unifi (Telekom Malaysia)
 Time dotCom

Mobile operators
 Altel
Celcom (Axiata; formerly TM Touch)
redONE [MVNO]
 Tune Talk [MVNO]
XOX Mobile (XOX Berhad) [MVNO]
 Digi (Telenor)
 ElectComms – PTT and CDMA only
 Maxis
 unifi Mobile (Webe Digital Sdn Bhd, acquired by Telekom Malaysia)
 U Mobile
 Yes (YTL Communications) (FDD/TDD-LTE)

WiMAX operators
 AMAX
 P1 (discontinued)
 Y-Max Networks Sdn Bhd

Maldives

Fixed line operators
 Dhiraagu (Cable & Wireless)

Mobile operators
 Dhiraagu (Cable & Wireless)
 Raajjé Online (Focus Infocom)
 Wataniya Telecom Maldives (Qtel)

Mali

Fixed line operators
 Sotelma

Mobile operators
 Malitel (Sotelma)
 Orange Mali (Orange S.A.)

Malta

Fixed line operators
 Epic (Monaco Telecom)
 GO (Dubai Holding)
 Hello
 Sky

Mobile operators
 Epic (Monaco Telecom)
 GO mobile (Dubai Holding)
 Melita Mobile

MVNO operators
 Flexiroam (MVNO)
 PING (MVNO)
 Redtouch Fone (MVNO)
 VFC Mobile (MVNO)

Martinique

Fixed line operators
 Orange (Orange S.A.)

Mobile operators
 Digicel (Digicel Group)

Mauritania

Fixed line operators

Mobile operators

Mauritius

Fixed line operators
 Mauritius Telecom

Mobile operators
 Airtel
 MyT
 Emtel
 Chilli (MTML)

Mayotte (France)

Fixed line operators

Mobile operators

Mexico

Fixed line operators
 Axtel/Alestra/Megacable (Grupo Alfa)
 Izzi Telecom (Grupo Televisa)
 Telmex (América Móvil)
 Totalplay (Grupo Salinas)

Mobile operators
 AT&T Mexico (AT&T)
 Movistar (Telefónica)
 Telcel (América Móvil)

Moldova

Fixed line operators
 Moldtelecom
 StarNet

Mobile operators
 Interdnestrcom
 Moldcell
 Orange Moldova
 Unité

Mongolia

Fixed line operators
 Mongolia Telecom Company 
 Mongolian Railway Authority

Mobile operators
 ONDO
 Mobicom Corporation
 Skytel
 Unitel
 G-Mobile

Montenegro

Fixed line operators
 m:tel (Telekom Srbija + Telekom Srpske)
T-Com Montenegro (Crnogorski Telekom)

Mobile operators
 m:tel (Telekom Srbija + Telekom Srpske)
T-Mobile Montenegro (Crnogorski Telekom)
Telenor Montenegro (PPF (company))

WiMAX operators 

 m:tel (Telekom Srbija + Telekom Srpske)
 WiMax Montenegro

Morocco

Fixed line operators
 INWI
 Maroc Telecom (Government of Morocco and Etisalat) 
 Méditel (Finance com and Orange SA)

Mobile operators
 INWI
 Maroc Telecom
 Méditel (Finance com and Telefónica)
 Orange (Orange S.A.)

Mozambique

Fixed line operators
 Telecommunicacoes De Mozambique (TDM)

Mobile network operators
 MCel (Government of Mozambique)
 Vodacom (Telkom and Vodafone)
 Movitel

Myanmar

Fixed line operators
 MPT
 Ooredoo Myanmar (Ooredoo) (WCDMA)
 Telenor Myanmar (Telenor)
 Mytel

Namibia

Fixed line operators
 Telecom Namibia

Mobile operators
 MTC Namibia

Nepal
Nepal is the first country to provide 3G general service in South Asia, followed by Sri Lanka, via Nepal Telecom. 3G service is available throughout the country, including Everest Base Camp. 4G LTE WIMAX service has been recently provided at minimum cost at spots in major cities including government offices, public places, malls, shopping centres, hospitals, restaurant, and public parks. It is also freely available in places of religious worship. Climbers of Mount Everest can use video call and other 3G services at the top of the mountain at no cost. LTE services have been installed in many base camps.

Fixed line operators
 CG Digital 
 Nepal Telecom

Mobile operators
SmartCell
 Hello Nepal
 Ncell GSM
 Nepal Telecom GSM & CDMA both
 United Telecom CDMA

Netherlands

Mobile operators 

 T-mobile Netherlands B.V.
 KPN B.V.
 Vodafone Libertel B.V.

New Caledonia

Fixed line operators

Mobile operators

New Zealand

Fixed line operators

National network owners
 Vodafone New Zealand
 Spark New Zealand (formerly Telecom New Zealand)
 Chorus Limited (formerly Telecom New Zealand)

Regulated UFB fibre companies (Crown Fibre Holdings suppliers)
 Chorus Limited

Resellers
 Orcon Internet Limited

Mobile operators
 2Degrees (Econet Wireless, NZ Communications) (GSM/WCDMA)
 Vodafone (GSM/WCDMA)
 Spark New Zealand (formerly Telecom New Zealand)(WCDMA)

Nicaragua

Mobile operators
 Claro (América Móvil)

Niger

Airtel Niger

Nigeria

Fixed line operators
 NITEL (Transcorp)
 Starcoms

Mobile operators
 Mtel (Transcorp)
 Airtel Nigeria (Airtel Group)
 Globacom
 MTN Nigeria (MTN Group)
 Etisalat Nigeria (Etisalat) – now re-branded 9mobile after Etisalat's withdrawal from the market
 Multilinks Telkom
 Starcomms
 Zoom Mobile
 Visafone

Macedonia

Fixed line operators
 Telekom (Magyar Telekom)
 vip (Telekom Austria)
 Neotel Macedonia
 Telekabel

Mobile operators
 Telekom (Magyar Telekom)
 A1.mk (Telekom Austria)
 Lycamobile.mk  full (MVNO) use of A1 network
 Telekabel.mk (Mvno) use Telekom network
 Greenmobile.mk (Mvno) use A1 network

Norway

Fixed line operators
 Telenor
 BaneTele
 TDCSong (TDC)
 Ventelo formerly Banetele
 Hafslund Telekom
 Altibox (Lyse AS)

Mobile operators
 Telenor Mobil (Telenor)
 Telia Norge (Telia Company)
 Ice Communication Norge AS (Lyse AS)

Oman

Fixed line operators
 Omantel
 Ooredoo Oman (was Nawras)

Mobile operators
 Oman Mobile (Omantel)
 Ooredoo Oman (was Nawras) (Ooredoo Group & TDC)

Pakistan

Fixed line operators
 PTCL (Etisalat)

Mobile operators
 Jazz (VimpelCom)
 Ufone (PTCL)
 Zong (China Mobile)
 Telenor Pakistan (Telenor)

Wireless Local Loop Operators
 PTCL (Etisalat)
 Wateen 
 WorldCall
 Wi-Tribe (Qtel)
 Stormfiber
 Sybernet

Palestinian Territories

Fixed line operators
 Paltel

Mobile operators
 Jawwal
 Ooredoo Palestine (Qtel)

Panama

Fixed line operators
 Cable & Wireless Panama (CWC)

Mobile operators
 Cable & Wireless Móvil (CWC)
 Tigo Panama (Millicom)
 Digicel Panama (Digicel)
 Claro Panama (América Móvil)

Papua New Guinea

Fixed line operators
 Telikom PNG

Mobile operators
 B-Mobile PNG (Black Dolphin/Capital Way Consortium)
 Citifon (Telikom PNG)
 Digicel (Digicel Group)

Paraguay

Fixed line operators
 Copaco

Mobile operators
 Tigo Paraguay (Millicom)
 Personal (Telecom Italia)
 Claro (América Móvil)

Peru

Fixed line operators
 Telefónica
 Claro (Telmex)

Mobile operators
 Movistar (Telefónica)
 Claro (América Móvil)
 Bitel (Viettel Peru)
 Entel Perú (Entel Chile)

Philippines

Fixed line operators
 Converge ICT
 Eastern Communications
 Globe Telecom
 PLDT

Mobile operators
 Dito Telecommunity
 Globe Telecom (via Globe, TM)
 Now Telecom (provisional)
 Smart Communications (via Smart, TNT)

Poland

Fixed line operators
 Orange Polska (Orange S.A.)
 Netia (Cyfrowy Polsat S.A.)
 TK Telekom (Netia)
 UPC Polska (Liberty Global)

Mobile operators
 Orange Polska (Orange S.A.)
 T-Mobile (Deutsche Telekom)
 Play (P4)
 Plus (Polkomtel)

Portugal

Fixed line operators
 MEO (PT/Altice)
 NOS (Sonaecom)
 NOWO (Grupo másmóvil)
 Vodafone (Vodafone Plc.)

Mobile operators
 MEO (PT/Altice)
 NOS (Sonaecom)
 NOWO (Grupo másmóvil)
 Vodafone (Vodafone Plc.)

Puerto Rico

Fixed line operators
 Puerto Rico Telephone (PRT-Claro) (América Movil)
 Centennial Puerto Rico Residential (AT&T – before: Centennial Corp.)
 San Juan Cable/Liberty Cablevision Puerto Rico (Liberty Cablevision of Puerto Rico – before: OneLink Communications, Inc.) (uses VOIP)
 Liberty Cablevision Puerto Rico (uses VOIP)
 Choice Cable TV (uses VOIP)

Mobile operators
 Claro Puerto Rico (mobile phone network) (América Móvil)
 AT&T Mobility (AT&T)
 T-Mobile Puerto Rico (T-Mobile Puerto Rico, LLC. / Deutsche Telekom)
 Sprint (Sprint Nextel Corp.) (Roaming: Open Mobile)
 TracFone Wireless (América Móvil)
 Open Mobile Puerto Rico
 Virgin Mobile (via Sprint Network)
 Boost Mobile (via Sprint Network)

Qatar

Fixed line operators
 Ooredoo
Vodafone Qatar

Mobile operators
 Ooredoo
 Vodafone Qatar

Réunion (France)

Fixed line operators

Mobile operators
SFR Réunion

Orange Réunion

Only Réunion

Romania

Fixed line operators
 Telekom Romania (Romtelecom + COSMOTE)
 Digi.Tel (RCS&RDS)
 GTS Telecom
 UPC Romania (Liberty Global)
 Atlas Telecom
 CTTc (Contact Telecom Romania)

Mobile operators
 Orange Romania (Orange S.A.)
 Vodafone Romania (Vodafone)
 Telekom Romania (Romtelecom + COSMOTE)
 Digi.Mobil (RCS&RDS)

Russia

Fixed line operators
 Rostelecom
 Moscow City Telephone Network

Mobile operators
 Beeline Russia (VEON)
 MegaFon/Yota (USM Holdings)
 MTS (Sistema)
 Tele2 Russia (Rostelecom, by license of Tele2 AB)
 MOTIV

Rwanda

Fixed line operators
 Rwandatel

Mobile operators
 MTN Rwandacell (MTN Group)
 Rwanda Airtel 
 Tigo Rwanda
 Rwandatel

Saint Kitts and Nevis

Fixed line operators
 LIME

Mobile operators
 LIME
 Digicel (Digicel Group)

Saint Lucia

Fixed line operators
 Cable&Wireless/LIME
 Karib Cable

Mobile operators
 Digicel (Digicel Group)

Saint Vincent and the Grenadines

Fixed line operators
 LIME

Mobile operators
 Digicel (Digicel Group)

Samoa

Fixed line operators

Mobile operators

São Tomé

Fixed line operators

Mobile operators

Saudi Arabia

Fixed line operators
 Saudi Telecom Company
 Mobily (Etisalat)
 GO (Etihad Atheeb Telecom)

Mobile operators
 Saudi Telecom Company
 Mobily (Etisalat)
 Zain Saudi Arabia (Zain)
 Virgin Mobile (Virgin Group) (MVNO with STC)
 Lebara Mobile (Etihad Jawraa) (MVNO with Mobily)

Senegal

Fixed line operators
 Sonatel

Mobile operators
 Expresso – Senegal (CDMA)
 Orange (GSM)
 Tigo (GSM)

Serbia

Fixed line operators
 mts (Serbian Government)

Mobile operators
 mts (Telekom Srbija)
 Telenor Serbia (PPF (company))
 vip (Telekom Austria)

Sierra Leone

Fixed line operators
 Sierratel

Mobile operators
 Airtel Sierra Leone (Airtel Group)
 Africell (Lintel Holding)
 Comium

Singapore

Fixed line operators
 SingTel
 StarHub (Temasek Holdings, Qtel, NTT & MediaCorp)

Mobile operators
 SingTel
 M1
 StarHub
 Circles.Life
 MyRepublic
 TPG
 Grid Net – iDen & PTT Onlo

Slovakia

Fixed line operators
 Slovak Telekom (Deutsche Telekom)
 GTS Slovakia

Mobile operators
 Slovak Telekom (Deutsche Telekom)
 Orange (Orange S.A.)
 O2 Slovakia (O2 Czech republic)
 4KA (SWAN mobile)

Slovenia

Fixed line operators
 Telekom Slovenije
 Mega M
 T-2
 Telemach

Mobile operators
 Mobitel (Telekom Slovenije)
 Si.mobil (Telekom Austria & Vodafone)
 Tušmobil (Telemach)
 T-2

Solomon Islands

Fixed line operators
 Solomon Telekom Co Ltd (Our Telecom)

Mobile operators
 Bemobile/Vodafone 
 Our Telekom

Somalia

Fixed line operators
Hormuud Telecom
[AmteL]

Mobile Operators
Somtel

Mobile operators
Heersare telecom
[AmteL]

South Africa

Fixed line operators
 Telkom
 Neotel

Mobile

Duopoly 

 MTN Group
 Vodacom

Quadopoly 

 Telkom Mobile
 Cell C

Other 
 Rain
 Mr. Price Mobile 
 Virgin Mobile South Africa
 Me&You Mobile

Spain

Fixed line operators
 Movistar (Telefónica)
 Orange (Orange S.A.)
 Vodafone (Vodafone Plc.)
 Yoigo (Grupo másmóvil)

Mobile network operators
 Movistar (Telefónica)
 Orange (Orange S.A.)
 Vodafone (Vodafone Plc.)
 Yoigo (Grupo másmóvil)

Sri Lanka

Fixed line operators
 Dialog
 Lanka Bell
 SLTMobitel

Mobile operators
 Airtel
 Dialog
 Hutch
 SLTMobitel

Public pay phone operators
 Tritel

Dialog, Lanka Bell, and SLTMobitel are entitled to provide pay phone services according to their licences.

Sudan

Fixed line operators
 Thabit (Sudatel)
 Canar (Etisalat)

Mobile operators
 Sudani
 MTN Sudan (MTN Group)
 Zain Sudan (Zain Group)

Suriname

Fixed line operators
 Telesur

Mobile operators
 Airtel
 Digicel (Digicel Group)

Sweden

Fixed line operators
 Telia Company
 Tele2
 Glocalnet
 Universal Telecom
 Rix Telecom
 Telenor
 Vattenfall
Sky Broadband

Mobile operators
 Tele2
 Telenor Sweden (Telenor)
 Telia (Telia Company)
 3 (CK Hutchison Holdings)
 Nordisk Mobiltelefon

MVNO operators
 Halebop (Telia)
 Lyca Mobile
Vectone mobile
 GT Mobile
 Glocalnet (Telenor)
 Tango (Tele2)
 NewPhone (Telenor)
 Swedfone

Other operators
 Spring Mobil

VoIP operators
 Bredbandsbolaget (Telenor)
 Anstar Telecom
 HowSIP

Switzerland

Fixed line operators
 Swisscom
 Sunrise (Liberty Global)
 Salt

Mobile operators
 Swisscom
 Sunrise (Liberty Global)
 Salt

Swaziland

Fixed line operators
 Swaziland Post and Telecommunication Corporation (SPTC)

Mobile operators
 Swazi Mobile
 Swazi MTN

Syria

Fixed line operators
 Syrian Telecommunications Establishment (STE)

Mobile operators
 MTN Syria (MTN Group)
 SyriaTel

Taiwan

Fixed line operators
 Chunghwa Telecom
 Taiwan Fixed Network
 Sparq Telecommunications
 Asia Pacific Broadband Telecom

Mobile operators
 Chunghwa Telecom
 Taiwan Mobile
 FarEasTone
 Vibo
 Taiwan Telecom

Tajikistan

Fixed line operators
 Tajiktelecom

Mobile operators
 Tcell (Aga Khan Fund for Economic Development)
 Babilon-Mobile
 Beeline (ZET Mobile Ltd.)
 MegaFon (MegaFon)

Tanzania

Fixed line operators
 Tanzania Telecommunications Company Limited

Mobile operators
 Tanzania Telecommunications Company Limited
 Airtel Tanzania (Airtel Group)
 Tigo Tanzania (Millicom)
 Vodacom Tanzania (Vodacom)
 Sasatel Tanzania (Sasatel)
 Benson Informatics Tanzania (Benson)
 Zantel Tanzania (Etisalat)

Thailand

Fixed line operators
 National Telecom
 True Corporation

AIS Fibre

Mobile operators
 Advanced Info Service
 DTAC
 True Move

Togo

Fixed line operators
TOGOCOM

Mobile operators

Tonga
The country had 0.030 million main lines in use in 2012.

Fixed line operators

Mobile operators

Trinidad and Tobago

Fixed line operators
 bmobile
 FLOW
 Digicel

Mobile operators
 Digicel (Digicel Group)
 bmobile (TSTT & Cable & Wireless)

Tunisia

Fixed line operators
 Tunisie Telecom (TUNTEL)

Mobile operators
 Tunisiana (Ooredoo)
 Tunisie Telecom (TUNTEL)
 Orange

Turkey

Fixed line operators
 Türk Telekom
 Turkcell
 Vodafone (Vodafone Plc.)

Mobile operators
 Türk Telekom
 Turkcell
 Vodafone (Vodafone Plc.)

Turkmenistan

Fixed line operators
 Turkmen Telecom
 Ashgabat City Telephone Network

Mobile operators
 Altyn Asyr
 MTS Turkmenistan

Uganda

Fixed line operators
 MTN Uganda (MTN Group)
 Uganda Telecom

Mobile operators
 Airtel Uganda 
 K2 Telecom Acquired by Airtel Uganda
 MTN Uganda
 Uganda Telecom
 Vodafone Uganda
  Lyca Mobile

Ukraine

Fixed line operators
 Ukrtelecom

Mobile operators
 Kyivstar (holding company Veon, owned by Altimo (Alfa Group), Russia (56.2%) and Telenor, Norway (19.7%))
 Lifecell (Turkcell)
 Vodafone Ukraine and MTS (MTS, Russia (100%))
 PEOPLEnet (Telesystemy Ukrayinu)
 Intertelecom (Intertelecom)
 TryMob (Ukrtelecom)
 Lycamobile, virtual based on TryMob network (Lyca Group, Great Britain (100%))

VoIP operators
 TELECOMAX

United Arab Emirates

Fixed line operators
 Du
 Etisalat

Mobile operators
 Du
 Etisalat

United Kingdom

Fixed line operators
 BT (BT Group)
 O2 UK / Virgin Media (Virgin Media O2)
 Sky Broadband (Sky Group)
 Vodafone UK / TalkTalk (Vodafone)

Mobile operators
 EE (BT Group)
 O2 UK (Virgin Media O2)
 Three UK (Hutchison 3G)
 Vodafone UK (Vodafone)

United States

Fixed line operators (over $10 billion annual revenues)
 AT&T
 Charter Communications
 Comcast
 Cox Communications
 Lumen Technologies
 T-Mobile
 Verizon Communications (acquired XO Communications)

Fixed line operators ($1 to $10 billion annual revenues)
 Altice (Cablevision, Lightpath, and Suddenlink Communications)
 Cable One Sparklight
 Cincinnati Bell (acquired Hawaiian Telcom)
 Consolidated Communications (acquired FairPoint Communications)
 Crown Castle International Corp. (acquiring Lightower)
 Frontier Communications
 Granite Telecommunications
 GTT Communications (Acquiring Interoute)
IDT Corporation
 Mediacom
 Telephone and Data Systems (includes subsidiaries TDS Telecom and U.S. Cellular)
 Windstream Communications (acquired EarthLink)
 Zayo Group
WideOpenWest

Fixed line operators ($100 million to $1 billion annual revenues)
 ACN Inc.
 Alaska Communications
 Birch Communications & Cbeyond
 Cogent Communications
 GCI
 Lumos Networks
 Pac-West Telecomm
 Primus Telecom

Fixed line operators (less than $100 million annual revenues)
PMC Telecom

Mobile operators

United States Virgin Islands

Mobile operators
 Centennial Wireless (Centennial Communications) (CDMA)
 T-Mobile (Deutsche Telekom) (GSM)

Uruguay

Fixed line operators
 ANTEL

Mobile operators
 Ancel (Antel)
 Claro (América Móvil)
 Movistar (Telefónica)

Uzbekistan

Fixed line operators
 Ucell
 UMS
 Uzbektelecom
 Beeline

Mobile operators
 Coscom (uCell)
 UMS (Mobiuz)
 Perfectum Mobile
 Unitel (Beeline)
 Uzbektelecom Mobile
 Humans

Venezuela

Fixed line operators
 CANTV

Mobile operators
 Digitel
 Movilnet (CANTV)
 Movistar (Telefónica)

Vietnam

Fixed line operators
 Telecom
 SPT 
 Viettel
 VNPT 
 VTC 
 CMC

Mobile operators
 Airtel 
 Gtel 
 Hanoi Telecom 
 Mobifone 
 Viettel
 Vinaphone

Yemen

Mobile operators
 MTN Yemen (MTN Group)
 Sabafon
 Y (HiTS-UNITEL)
 Yemen Mobile

Zambia

Fixed line operators
 Zamtel

Mobile operators
 Airtel (Bharti group)
 MTN (MTN group)
 Zamtel (LAPGreen Group)

Zimbabwe

Fixed line operators
 TelOne

Mobile operators
 Airtel
 Econet Wireless 
 Net*One
 Telecel (Orascom)

See also
 Fixed phone
 Landline
 ITU-T
 List of mobile network operators of the Americas
 List of mobile network operators of the Asia Pacific region
 List of mobile network operators of Europe
 List of mobile network operators of the Middle East and Africa
 List of Canadian mobile phone companies
 List of Caribbean mobile phone companies
 List of mobile network operators
 Mobile network operator
 Mobile phone
 Mobile Virtual Network Operator
 Telephone company
 List of countries by number of broadband Internet subscriptions
 List of countries by number of Internet users
 List of countries by number of telephone lines in use
 List of countries by smartphone penetration
 List of multiple-system operators

References

 Electronic communications – 2nd quarter 2014

Telephone